Mahfuza Khatun is a Bangladeshi swimmer. She won two gold  medals in the 50 m & 100 m breaststroke swimming at the 2016 South Asian Games at Guwahati.

Early life 
Mahfuza Khatun was born into a poor family from Panchkabor village in Abhaynagar upazila, Jessore District. Her father's name is Ali Ahammad Gazi and mother's name is Karimon Nesa. She has four siblings.

She started competitive swimming in 1999 through a Shisu Academy swimming competition. She won her first medal in her 3rd grade. She won the first gold medal in 100-metre breaststroke in national age group swimming in Dhaka in 2002.

She was a student of Bangladesh Krira Shikkha Protishtan; national sports institute in the year of 2002. Then she did her graduation and post-graduation in Communication and Journalism at University of Chittagong in 2016. Initially she joined Ansar-VDP services team in 2010 but left in 2013 for Bangladesh Navy.

Career 
Mahfuza Khatun's favorite events are 100 and 50 meter breaststroke. She got her first SA games medal in Colombo 2006 in 100 m breaststroke. She won two bronze medals in 100 and 50 meter breaststroke swimming in that games.

Again in 2010 South Asian Games, she earned two silver medals in 100 and 50 meter breaststroke swimming. Gradually improving herself, Mahfuza won the 100 and 50 meter breaststroke gold in 2016 SA Games. In 50 meter, she breaks the SA Games record with the timing of 34.88 seconds in 2016.

She represented Bangladesh in 2010 Commonwealth Games in Delhi, 2010 FINA World Swimming Championships (25 m) in Dubai, 2013 World Aquatics Championships in Barcelona, 2014 Commonwealth Games in Glasgow.

Personal life
Khatun married another swimmer Shajahan Ali on 18 March 2016. They were dating for quite some time. Ali proposed to her in front of Tajmahal when they were at 2010 Commonwealth games in Delhi. Khatun and Ali have known each other from BKSP days since 2002.

Honours and achievements
Awards
 Sportsperson of the year award for 2016 awarded by Bangladesh Sports Press Association.

See also

 List of swimmers
 World record progression 50 metres breaststroke
 World record progression 100 metres breaststroke

References

External links
 From pool partner to life partner published in Prothom Alo March 27, 2016. 

1990 births
Living people
Female breaststroke swimmers
Bangladeshi female swimmers
Commonwealth Games competitors for Bangladesh
Swimmers at the 2010 Commonwealth Games
Swimmers at the 2014 Commonwealth Games
Swimmers at the 2010 Asian Games
South Asian Games gold medalists for Bangladesh
South Asian Games silver medalists for Bangladesh
South Asian Games bronze medalists for Bangladesh
Asian Games competitors for Bangladesh
South Asian Games medalists in swimming